Oliwer Magnusson (born 3 June 2000) is a Swedish freestyle skier who competes internationally.

Magnusson has competed in the FIS Freestyle World Ski Championships since 2017, and participated in the 2018 as well as the 2022 Winter Olympics.

References

External links

2000 births
Living people
Swedish male freestyle skiers
Olympic freestyle skiers of Sweden
Freestyle skiers at the 2018 Winter Olympics
Freestyle skiers at the 2022 Winter Olympics
People from Östersund
Sportspeople from Jämtland County